The Ewen Collection is a collection of railway letter stamps of the United Kingdom from 1891 to 1912 that forms part of the British Library Philatelic Collections. It was formed by Herbert L'Estrange Ewen and donated in 1949 by his sister Mrs Clement Williams.

See also
Parcel stamp
Turner Collection of Railway Letter Stamps

References

British Library Philatelic Collections
Philately of the United Kingdom
Cinderella stamps